Suki Chui Suk-Man (former name ; born 22 September 1984) is a Hong Kong actress, affiliated with TVB up to 8 January 2014. She participated in the Miss Hong Kong Pageant 2006 and was awarded with the Tourism Ambassador Award. She married Kenny Wee (Wong Ho 黃浩, whose father is from Kuching, Sarawak, Malaysia) on November 15, 2009.

Filmography

Competitions
Miss Hong Kong Pageant 2006

Television programmes

Dramas

Movies

MTV
 Eric Kwok - 專登 (2007)
 Juno Mak - 吃鯨魚的人 
 Raymond Lam (林峯) - 如果時間來到 (2009)

Awards
 2006 Miss Hong Kong Pageant - Tourism Ambassador
 2007 Next Media Television Award- Most Charming New Star
 2008 HAPPY SHOP Outstanding Artiste Award

References

The Green Grass of Home - Cast
Word Twisters Adventures - Cast

External links

Suki's Official Blog
Sweet Suki
 

1984 births
TVB actors
Living people